Stardust Five is five-piece surf rock and pop band based in Melbourne, Australia. The members of the band Dan Kelly, Paul Kelly, Dan Luscombe, Peter Luscombe and Bill MacDonald have played, in other bands including The Last Gasp, Dan Kelly and the Alpha Males, Max Q, The Blackeyed Susans and Michelle Shocked.

A number of their recordings were prompted by different requests for film and TV soundtrack submissions. This gave Stardust Five its underlining theme – songs with a visually evocative feeling.

Personnel
 Paul Kelly – guitar, vocals
 Dan Kelly - guitar
 Peter Luscombe – drums
 Dan Luscombe - guitar, keyboards, vocals
 Bill MacDonald - bass

Discography

Albums
 Stardust Five – March 2006

Singles
 "Pussy got your Tongue" - 2006

References

External links
 Stardust Five Bio
 Stardust Five article - Rhythms magazine
 Sydney Morning Herald article

Musical groups established in 2005
Paul Kelly (Australian musician)
Victoria (Australia) musical groups